Jomo Gamal Thomas is an American businessman, attorney, and author based in New York City.

Early life
Thomas was born in the Bronx, New York on January 31, 1974. He grew up in Roosevelt and Uniondale, New York. During his teenage years, he was very active as a motivational speaker, community organizer and activist with the Economic Opportunity Commission of Nassau County and its satellite community organization, Operation Outreach.

He received an American Economic Association fellowship to study in their summer training and minority scholarship program at Stanford University. Thomas graduated with honors in economics from Brandeis University (1996) in Waltham, Massachusetts. He received his J.D. degree from the George Washington University Law School (2000) in Washington, D.C. Thomas was the former editor of The George Washington University Law School Corporate & Business Law Journal.

Business
Thomas is co-founder of CBD Ventures, a venture capital company.

He also founded Niche Lab Capital Group, a private venture capital group which financed the personal finance publications of Latino Money Magazine now known as Latinos Money Magazine and  now known as Black Wealth and Fortunes Magazine which is now known as Black Wealth and Fortune Magazine.

Latinos Money Magazine is noted for annually publishing the Latino Money Magazine 100 richest Hispanic Americans, the wealthiest Latino billionaires and Latino millionaires.  Black Wealth and Fortune Magazine is noted for publishing the Black Wealth and Fortune 100 Richest Black People in America, the wealthiest black billionaires and black millionaires. The Black Wealth and Fortune''' magazine has become very popular for its 100 Richest African Americans List.

Thomas, along with Monifa Thomas published The Black Millionaire Next Door: Black Wealth in 2003. He was featured on Tavis Smiley Show on NPR (National Public Radio) discussing Black Wealth and Fortunes Magazine special report, "The Black Millionaire Next Door: Black Wealth 2003". The report explored the myth that most wealthy African Americans made their money in sports and entertainment. Thomas is managing director of Niche Lab Capital Group, and Monifa Thomas is editor of Black Wealth and Fortunes''.

Thomas is the founder and chairman of J.G. Thomas & Associates, a New York law firm that concentrates on business law, asset protection and estate planning, entertainment law, intellectual property law and immigration law.

Media, popular culture and lectures
Jomo Gamal Thomas was at the forefront of uncovering multimillion-dollar real estate mortgage scam fraud in New York City.  He was featured in the Brooklyn Brief article, "Real Estate Fraud Ring Gleaning Illicit Rents From Scores of Properties" by Matthew Taub.  He was featured in the New York Times, Real Estate Shell Companies Scheme to Defraud Homeowners Out of their homes" an  article by Stepanie Saul.   In 2015, Brooklyn Borough President Eric Adams gave special thanks to Jomo Gamal Thomas, Esq., for bringing the extent of the predatory harassment and mortgage scam behavior to his attention.

He has been a passionate advocate for military families seeking to recover life insurance survivor benefits via the Servicemembers' Group Life Insurance plan for families of military veterans, working with attorney Cristobal Bonifaz.

In New York City, Jomo Thomas was featured on We Care Radio program.  He is a motivational, educational and inspirational radio speaker that regularly appeared on WLIB 1190 AM and on WVIP 93.5FM.  He also a public speaker who has lectured at high schools, colleges, conferences, community centers and religious institutions.  He has lectured on copyright, trademark infringement, intellectual property licensing, wealth management and estates.  He is the founder of "Don't Procrastinate Organization"  whose mission is to increase productivity and provide educational information.

References

 Perdue, L (1999). "New D.C. Incubator Born, The nation's capital is experiencing a baby boom of sorts—in technology incubators that is.
 Tavis Smiley NPR Radio. https://www.npr.org/2003/10/21/1473341/the-black-millionaire-next-door.

External links
 Official Website

African-American radio personalities
21st-century American businesspeople
American finance and investment writers
American motivational speakers
American talk radio hosts
Brandeis University alumni
George Washington University Law School alumni
New York (state) lawyers
People from the Bronx
Writers from New York (state)
1974 births
Living people
People from Roosevelt, New York
People from Uniondale, New York
Activists from New York (state)